Anu is a genus of hoverfly, from the family Syrphidae, in the order Diptera. It is only known from New Zealand.

Species
A. una Thompson, 2008

References

Diptera of New Zealand
Hoverfly genera
Syrphinae
Monotypic Diptera genera